The Tucson Gem, Mineral & Fossil Showcase are gem and mineral shows that take place annually in late January and February at multiple locations across the city of Tucson, Arizona. Most of the shows are open to the public, except for certain trade shows which require registration with a business license.

The key event of the Gem, Mineral & Fossil Showcase is the Tucson Gem & Mineral Show produced by the Tucson Gem and Mineral Society. This show has been held annually since 1955 and now occupies  of the Tucson Convention Center. Many museums and universities, including the Smithsonian Institution and the Sorbonne, have displayed at the Tucson Gem and Mineral Show.

The first Tucson Gem and Mineral Show was held in an elementary school in 1955 and shortly thereafter moved to a Quonset hut at the Tucson Fair Grounds. In 1973, it moved into the Tucson Community Center, first occupying the North Exhibit Hall, then expanding into the Arena and upper Arena concourse. After the completion of the new facility in 1990, which is now called the Tucson Convention Center, the Tucson Gem and Mineral Show now occupies the Arena, Exhibition Halls A-B-C, Galleria and Ballrooms. Katherine Rambo estimates that between 1996 and 2010 there was an average of about thirteen hundred total dealers from forty-nine states and thirty-two countries in attendance, annually. The 2021 show was canceled due to the COVID-19 pandemic.

The Tucson Gem, Mineral & Fossil Showcase is one of the single highest revenue-producing events for the Tucson economy. The estimated economic impact in 2018 was $120 million.

The 2021 showcase was pushed back from the typical dates to April due to the COVID-19 pandemic. While some of the shows were present, the main show at the Tucson Convention Center and some of the other shows were cancelled.

See also
 Denver Coliseum Mineral, Fossil, Gem, and Jewelry Show, second largest U.S. show.
 Mineral collecting
 Mineralientage, the Munich Mineral Show, Europe's largest

References

 Haubrich, K. (2016) 62nd Tucson Gem, Mineral Show kicks off
 Pallack, B. (2016) 60,000 visitors expected at 62nd gem shows
 Butch-Buus, L. (2016) Gem and Mineral Show a big boon to Tucson

Trade shows in the United States
Culture of Tucson, Arizona
Tourist attractions in Tucson, Arizona